Promops is a genus of free-tailed bats.

Species
 Promops centralis - big crested mastiff bat
 Promops davisoni
 Promops nasutus - brown mastiff bat

References

 
Molossidae
Bat genera
Taxa named by Paul Gervais